Kuchary  is a village in the administrative district of Gmina Drobin, within Płock County, Masovian Voivodeship, in central Poland.

The village has a population of 210.

The Buddhist Gompa Karma Kagyu is located in Kuchary.

References

Kuchary